Ardscoil Rís (meaning  High School) is a voluntary boys' secondary school on Griffith Avenue, Dublin, Ireland. The school caters for approximately 570 students every year. 

 However, they withdrew from direct work in education in Ireland in September 2006 and the school passed into the trusteeship of the Edmund Rice Schools Trust, established by the Brothers.

History and expansion

Ardscoil Ris partly originated with the O'Brien Institute, a charitable residence and school for male orphans, in 1969. The new school incorporated the existing second-level students from the old school and day pupils from the surrounding area. Old dormitories were converted into classrooms and an old reception room became the staff room.

In 1970 and 1971 six prefab classrooms were constructed, and on 21 November 1973 the new school building was officially opened by the Irish president, Éamon de Valera.

In 1979 the school won the Hogan Cup, winning the All-Ireland Colleges football title for the only time. No Dublin school has won it since.

In 1984 a new wing was added with dressing rooms, showers, a Library and Audio-Visual Room. The school continued to perform well on the sports field, and most students went on to third level education at this point. In 1998 a modern sports hall was completed and officially opened by the Taoiseach Bertie Ahern and Diarmuid Martin, the Archbishop of Dublin, and in 1999 six new classrooms were built, a new wing for the library was constructed, and some much needed office space has eased the pressure on space in the school.

In 2001 the science labs were refurbished, and in 2003 the new computer room was completed, while in later years, the computers have been upgraded. In 2005 the school designated a permanent art room.
In 2013/2014 the library was renovated. New book shelves, tables, better cushioned chairs and new blackout blinds. Chairs and blinds sponsored by the Students Council. In 2015, all the computers in the Technical Graphics room have been replaced with state-of-the-art, high-end computers which are required for projects such as Computer Aided Design, and in 2015/2016 the GP Area has been refurnished by the Students Council.  During 2016-2018 major changes have been planned for the sports ground. Changes include ground levelling, new ground equipment and other major changes which are estimated by the Board of Management, Parents Council, Sports Dept. and Students Council to cost over €250,000. The project has begun (Spring 2016–Present)

Subjects 

Notes:
 Work experience is a fundamental part of 4th year, three weeks of work experience will take place during the school year, with another week optional (permission from management needed)
 Optional subjects at Leaving Cert level are subject to demand.
 Religion is not an exam subject at Leaving Certificate (but is at Junior Cycle level) and is taught as part of the school's Catholic ethos.
 Social, Personal and Health Education is not an exam subject.
 Construction Studies is a continuation of Woodwork

Achievements

Ardscoil Rís is often noted for its academic achievements; in 2005 the school sent more students to Dublin City University than any other boys' school on Dublin's Northside. As a percentage of students taking the Leaving Certificate exam the school topped the list of students provided to DCU. More than two thirds of all Leaving Certificate students went on to third level education that year. In 2008 the school sent 28 pupils to DCU, more than any other school in the state bar the Institute of Education. As a percentage of students taking the Leaving Certificate the figure is the highest for any school in the state.

In sport, ardscoil's most recent successes included the Under-18 football team being crowned Dublin Senior Football Champions for 2008. A man of the match performance from centre back Aidan Collopy saw the trophy brought back to Ard Scoil. The team was beaten in the Leinster Final by Colaiste Iosagainn, Laois. The Under-19 Basketball team reached the 2008 All Ireland Cup Final, which was screened on Setanta TV. However, they lost by three points to St. Malachy's, Belfast. In the 2008/2009 Academic Year the school reached the Under-18 "B" Dublin Colleges final but was beaten by Oatlands College. Ard Scoil's Under-14 footballers defeated Castleknock in the 2008 U/14"A" Dublin Colleges Football Semi Final before going on to capture the title for the first time since 2002, beating Colaiste Eoin in the Final.

Ardscoil also reached the Semi-Final stage of the 2009, 2012 and 2013 National Senior Concern Debating Competition.

In 2010/2011 the school's Under-16s won the Dublin football/hurling double for the first time in 20 years while the 1st Year Basketballers won the school's first ever Division 1 East Region title. They later finished runners up in the All Ireland First Year tournament. The title was subsequently stripped from the winners, St. Malachy's, Belfast, for playing illegal players but was not awarded to Ardscoil due to Basketball Ireland regulations. Ris repeated as U/16 hurling champions in 2011 and won both the Dublin and Leinster Senior B Football titles in early 2012.

Student continuation to third level education

Percentage of students who continues to third level education

Numbers attending each third level institution

ITC (Information, Communication, Technology) facilities in Ardscoil Rís

A strict Internet usage policy was introduced in 2004 and all pupils wishing to use the internet must sign the policy along with their parents. The policy can be viewed on the school's official website. WiFi is in use for teachers.

The school has a total of 48 student-usable computers (under supervision) and there is a computer in every classroom. Printing facilities are also available for teaching staff.

Past pupils
Ardscoil Ris has a number of past pupils who have become household names in Ireland and further afield. Dublin GAA senior football players Ciarán Whelan, Tomas Quinn, Cormac Costello and Diarmuid Connolly and also former Dublin senior football manager Pat Gilroy are former pupils, as is Dublin senior hurling player Ronan Fallon. Blackburn Rovers and Republic of Ireland midfielder Keith Andrews was also a pupil, as is current Shelbourne F.C. player Conan Byrne. International Airlines Group chief executive Willie Walsh graduated in the late 70's while Labour Party senator Derek McDowell is also a past pupil. The former Moscow correspondent of the Irish Times Conor Sweeney also attended Ardscoil Ris. Senior civil servant Robert Watt attended the school.

Students Council

The school has an active Students Council with about 20 members. The Students Council organises and sponsors many events in the school including:
 The Annual School Walk
 First Year Quiz & First Year Bonding Day
 Awareness Week
 Small renovations throughout the school
 St. Vincent DePaul hampers
 Grants for students to go to Gaeltachts
 Careers Day (for 5th and 6th Year Students) (Approx. 25 unique professions, including the Irish Defence Forces)
 The School Library (Tuesday - supervised)

The current chairmen as of the beginning of the academic year of 2020 are Conor Davis and Eoin Caverly, with Aidan Curran as vice-chairman and Conor McGuiness as secretary.

Principal

Pat Reilly retired as principal in 2009 after eleven years - the longest serving principal to date. Mark Neville served as principal of the school from 2014-2020.  Ciarán O’Callaghan stepped up as acting principal following the departure of Mark Neville in November 2020.  The current principal is John McHugh

Activities

The school offers after school activities such as a History Club, Drama Club and Debating Club. The school boasts one of the top Debating teams in the Concern Debating competition.

Some of the athletic activities in the school are Gaelic football, hurling and basketball. The school also offers athletics, golf and badminton.

References

External links 
 

Boys' schools in the Republic of Ireland
Secondary schools in Dublin (city)
Congregation of Christian Brothers secondary schools in the Republic of Ireland
Educational institutions established in 1972